Agravity Boys (stylized in all caps) is a Japanese manga series written and illustrated by Atsushi Nakamura. It was serialized in Shueisha's Weekly Shōnen Jump magazine from December 2019 to January 2021 and epilogue chapter was published in Jump GIGA in April 2021. Its chapters were collected in seven tankōbon volumes.

Publication
Agravity Boys, written and illustrated by Atsushi Nakamura, was serialized in Weekly Shōnen Jump from December 9, 2019 to January 4, 2021, and an epilogue chapter was published in Jump GIGA on April 30, 2021. Shueisha collected its chapters in seven tankōbon volumes, released from April 3, 2020, to July 2, 2021.

The manga is digitally published in English by Viz Media on its Shonen Jump website and the Manga Plus platform.

Volume list

Reception
In 2020, the manga was nominated for the 6th Next Manga Awards and placed 6th out of the 50 nominees with 15,339 votes. The series ranked 25th on the 2021 "Book of the Year" list by Da Vinci magazine.

References

External links
 

Comedy anime and manga
Science fiction anime and manga
Shōnen manga
Shueisha manga
Viz Media manga